Ingrid Ostler (born 8 April 1948) is an Austrian figure skater. She competed in the ladies' singles event at the 1964 Winter Olympics.

References

External links
 

1948 births
Living people
Austrian female single skaters
Olympic figure skaters of Austria
Figure skaters at the 1964 Winter Olympics
Figure skaters from Vienna